"White Flag" is a worship song released by Passion as the lead single from their 2012 live album, Passion: White Flag, on March 9, 2012. It features guest vocals from American Christian music singer Chris Tomlin. The song peaked at No. 8 on the Christian Songs Billboard chart and appeared on the 2012 year-end Christian Songs chart at No. 20. Tomlin later released an album version of this song on his 2013 album, Burning Lights.

Track listing 

 Digital download

 "White Flag (feat. Chris Tomlin)" – 5:03

 Digital download (Chris Tomlin album version)

 "White Flag" – 4:33

Charts

Weekly charts

Year-end charts

References 

2012 debut singles
2012 songs
Passion Conferences songs
Songs written by Jason Ingram
Songs written by Matt Maher
Songs written by Chris Tomlin